The New Jersey Athletic Conference (NJAC), formerly the New Jersey State Athletic Conference, is a college athletic conference affiliated with the NCAA's Division III. All of its full members are public universities in New Jersey. Affiliate members (track-only, men's tennis-only, or football-only) are located in Delaware, Maryland, New York, Pennsylvania, Virginia, and Wisconsin.

History

Chronological timeline
 1957 - In 1957, the NJAC was founded as the New Jersey State Athletic Conference (NJSAC). Charter members included Glassboro State College (now Rowan University), Montclair State College (now Montclair State University), Jersey City State College (now New Jersey City University), Newark State College (now Kean University), Trenton State College (now The College of New Jersey), and William Paterson College (now William Paterson University), effective beginning the 1957-58 academic year.
 1976 - Ramapo College of New Jersey joined the NJSAC, effective in the 1976-77 academic year.
 1977 - Stockton State College (now Stockton University) joined the NJSAC, effective in the 1977-78 academic year.
 1985 - Women's programs became part of the NJSAC, when the Jersey Athletic Conference (a women's sports athletic conference) was merged into the NJSAC. Therefore it was rebranded as the New Jersey Athletic Conference (NJAC), effective in the 1985-86 academic year.
 1985 - Rutgers University at Camden and Rutgers University at Newark joined the NJAC, effective in the 1985-86 academic year.
 2000 - The State University of New York at Cortland joined the NJAC as an associate member for football, effective in the 2000 fall season (2000-01 academic year).
 2004 - New Jersey City left the NJAC to become an NCAA D-III Independent, effective after the 2003-04 academic year.
 2004 - Western Connecticut State University joined the NJAC as an associate member for football, effective in the 2004 fall season (2004-05 academic year).
 2005 - New Jersey City re-joined back to the NJAC after spending one season as an NCAA Division III Independent school, effective in the 2005-06 academic year.
 2006 - Buffalo State College joined the NJAC as an associate member for football, effective in the 2006 fall season (2006-07 academic year).
 2008 - The State University of New York at Brockport and the State University of New York at Morrisville joined the NJAC as associate members for football, effective in the 2008 fall season (2008-09 academic year).
 2011 - The State University of New York at Farmingdale (Farmingdale State College) and St. Joseph's College–Long Island joined the NJAC as associate members for men's and women's indoor and outdoor track & field, effective in the 2011-12 academic year).
 2012 - Buffalo State left the NJAC as an associate member for football, effective after the 2011 fall season (2011-12 academic year).
 2013 - Western Connecticut State left the NJAC as an associate member for football, effective after the 2012 fall season (2012-13 academic year).
 2014 - SUNY Brockport left the NJAC as an associate member for football, effective after the 2013 fall season (2013-14 academic year).
 2014 - Southern Virginia University joined the NJAC as an associate member for football, effective in the 2014 fall season (2014-15 academic year).
 2015 - SUNY Cortland and SUNY Morrisville left the NJAC as associate members for football, effective after the 2014 fall season (2014-15 academic year).
 2015 - Christopher Newport University, Frostburg State University, Salisbury University and Wesley College joined the NJAC as associate members for football, all effective in the 2015 fall season (2015-16 academic year).
 2019 - Frostburg State and Southern Virginia left the NJAC as associate members for football, effective after the 2018 fall season (2018-19 academic year).
 2019 - Five institutions joined the NJAC as associate members: Pennsylvania State University at Harrisburg for men's and women's indoor and outdoor track & field, and the State University of New York at Oneonta, the University of Wisconsin–Eau Claire, the University of Wisconsin–La Crosse and the University of Wisconsin–Whitewater for men's tennis, all effective in the 2019-20 academic year.
 2021 - Wesley (Del.) left the NJAC as an associate member for football after the school closed down to later be acquired by Delaware State University, effective after the 2020 fall season (2020-21 academic year).

Member schools

Current members
The NJAC currently has ten full members, all are public schools:

Notes

Affiliate members
The NJAC currently has nine affiliate members, all but one are public schools:

Former affiliate members
The NJAC has eight former affiliate members, all but two were public schools:

Notes

Membership timeline

Sports
The NJAC sponsors championships in the following sports:

National championship teams

Since the NCAA established the three division system in 1973, NJAC members have won a total of 63 team championships.

Baseball
Kean:  2007
Montclair State:  1987, 1993, 2000
Ramapo:  1984
Rowan:  1978, 1979
William Paterson: 1992, 1996

Men's Basketball
Rowan: 1996

Field Hockey
Rowan: 2002
TCNJ: 1981, 1983, 1985, 1988, 1990, 1991, 1995, 1996, 1999, 2011

Men's Golf
Ramapo: 1982

Women's Lacrosse

TCNJ: 1985, 1987, 1988, 1991, 1992, 1993, 1994, 1995, 1996, 1998, 2000, 2005, 2006

Men's Soccer

Kean: 1992
Richard Stockton: 2001
Rowan: 1981, 1990
TCNJ: 1996

Women's Soccer

TCNJ: 1993, 1994, 2000

Softball

Rutgers-Camden: 2006
TCNJ: 1983, 1987, 1989, 1992, 1994, 1996

Women's Tennis

TCNJ: 1986

Men's Outdoor Track

Rowan: 1980, 1981, 1982, 1983, 1984

Wrestling

Montclair State: 1976, 1986
TCNJ: 1979, 1981, 1984, 1985, 1987

References

External links